Randolph Smith (December 12, 1948 – June 4, 2009) was an American professional basketball player who set the NBA record for consecutive games played. From 1972–1982, Smith played in every regular season game, en route to a then-record of 906 straight games (since broken by A. C. Green). In college, he was a Division II All-American basketball player, soccer player and track athlete. He was born in Bellport, New York.

College career
Smith was an outstanding all-around athlete at Buffalo State College, earning All-American honors in three sports: basketball, soccer and track. However, it was on the basketball court that Smith shone brightest, teaming with Durie Burns to lead the Bengals to three straight conference championships, including a trip to the Final Four of the NCAA Division II Tournament in 1970, where Smith earned All-Tournament honors.

Professional career

Buffalo Braves / San Diego Clippers (1971–1979) 
Smith surprised everyone in training camp, and he made the final roster cuts. Despite standing only 6-foot-3, he was assigned to play forward. He averaged 13.4 points per game in his rookie season. Smith continued to improve beyond expectation, drawing on his tremendous speed, quickness and leaping ability. His style of play, along with contemporaries like Julius Erving, marked by fast breaks and "above the rim" ball movements influenced the offensive style of the NBA in the late 1970s and early 1980s. Playing alongside league scoring champion Bob McAdoo, Smith averaged 21.8 points per game in the 1975–76 season, and was named to the All-NBA Second Team.

The highlight of Smith's career was the 1978 NBA All-Star Game, where he came off the bench to lead all scorers with 27 points, and was named the game's Most Valuable Player.

Smith played for seven years for the Braves until the franchise became the San Diego Clippers in 1978. That first year with the Clippers, Smith had his fourth consecutive season averaging over 20 points per game.

Cleveland Cavaliers (1979–1981) 
In 1979, Smith was traded to the Cleveland Cavaliers, where he was named team captain and played for two years.

New York Knicks (1981–1982) 
Smith spent the 1981 season with the New York Knicks.

Return to San Diego (1982–1983) 
The next season, Smith moved back to San Diego for another season.

On November 3, 1982, Smith played in his 845th consecutive NBA game, breaking Johnny Kerr's iron man record. The game was a 130–111 loss to the Philadelphia 76ers in which Smith started and scored 14 points. Smith's iron man streak ended at 906 games when he played his last game with the Clippers on March 13, 1983. He had requested to be waived to play for a contender late in the 1982–83 NBA season and he missed a game while waiting to clear waivers. The record was later surpassed by A. C. Green in 1997.

Atlanta Hawks (1983) 
Smith was traded to the Atlanta Hawks, where he played 15 games before retiring.

NASL
In early 1975 at age 26, while nearing the height of his basketball career, Smith turned many heads at a tryout for the expansion Tampa Bay Rowdies of the North American Soccer League. The Rowdies' management had hoped to sign the two-time college soccer All-American for the outdoor season as one of their "required" American players; however, his contract with the Braves would not allow him to play professional soccer at the time. A year later while in between basketball contracts, the Rowdies gave him another look, but it wasn't meant to be. After a third and final tryout in 1977, Rowdies coach Eddie Firmani felt that the combination of playing pro basketball and not playing any soccer for so long had diminished Smith's soccer skills too much.

Post-NBA
After retiring as a player, Smith was an NBA league executive whose duties included assisting former players in need, and he was a coach in the Continental Basketball Association before working at Mohegan Sun in Uncasville, where he worked in marketing.

Smith was inducted into the Suffolk Sports Hall of Fame on Long Island in the Basketball Category with the Class of 1990. He was inducted into the Greater Buffalo Sports Hall of Fame in 1992.

On June 4, 2009, Smith died in Norwich, Connecticut, after a heart attack during a workout. He's buried at the Forest Lawn East Cemetery, Weddington, NC.

NBA career statistics

Regular season 

|-
| style="text-align:left;"| 
| style="text-align:left;"|Buffalo
| 76 || – || 27.6 || .482 || – || .622 || 4.8 || 2.5 || – || – || 13.4
|-
| style="text-align:left;"| 
| style="text-align:left;"|Buffalo
| 82 || – || 31.7 || .443 || – || .727 || 4.8 || 5.1 || – || – || 14.8
|-
| style="text-align:left;"| 
| style="text-align:left;"|Buffalo
| 82 || – || 33.5 || .492 || – || .712 || 3.8 || 4.7 || 2.5 || 0.0 || 15.5
|-
| style="text-align:left;"| 
| style="text-align:left;"|Buffalo
| 82 || – || 36.6 || .484 || – || .800 || 4.2 || 6.5 || 1.7 || 0.0 || 17.8
|-
| style="text-align:left;"| 
| style="text-align:left;"|Buffalo
| 82 || – || 38.6 || .494 || – || .817 || 5.1 || 5.9 || 1.9 || 0.0 || 21.8
|-
| style="text-align:left;"| 
| style="text-align:left;"|Buffalo
| 82 || – || 37.7 || .467 || – || .762 || 5.6 || 5.4 || 2.1 || 0.1 || 20.7
|-
| style="text-align:left;"| 
| style="text-align:left;"|Buffalo
| 82 || – || 40.4 || .465 || – || .800 || 3.8 || 5.6 || 2.1 || 0.1 || 24.6
|-
| style="text-align:left;"| 
| style="text-align:left;"|San Diego
| 82 || – || 37.9 || .455 || – || .813 || 3.6 || 4.8 || 2.2 || 0.1 || 20.5
|-
| style="text-align:left;"| 
| style="text-align:left;"|Cleveland
| 82 || – || 32.6 || .452 || .189 || .823 || 3.1 || 4.4 || 1.5 || 0.1 || 17.6
|-
| style="text-align:left;"| 
| style="text-align:left;"|Cleveland
| 82 || – || 26.8 || .466 || .036 || .815 || 2.4 || 4.4 || 1.4 || 0.2 || 14.6
|-
| style="text-align:left;"| 
| style="text-align:left;"|New York
| 82 || 40 || 24.8 || .465 || .273 || .808 || 1.9 || 3.1 || 1.1 || 0.0 || 10.0
|-
| style="text-align:left;"| 
| style="text-align:left;"|San Diego
| 65 || 16 || 19.4 || .489 || .188 || .863 || 1.4 || 3.0 || 0.8 || 0.0 || 9.1
|-
| style="text-align:left;"| 
| style="text-align:left;"|Atlanta
| 15 || 0 || 9.5 || .439 || .000 || .929 || 0.5 || 0.9 || 0.1 || 0.0 || 4.7
|- class="sortbottom"
| style="text-align:center;" colspan="2"| Career
| 976 || 56 || 32.2 || .470 || .155 || .781 || 3.7 || 4.6 || 1.7 || 0.1 || 16.7 
|- class="sortbottom"
| style="text-align:center;" colspan="2"| All-Star
| 2 || 0 || 22.0 || .714 || – || .833 || 4.0 || 4.5 || 1.5 || 0.5 || 17.5

Playoffs 

|-
|style="text-align:left;"|1974
|style="text-align:left;"|Buffalo
|6||–||37.8||.400||–||.650||4.3||4.5||1.7||0.2||14.2
|-
|style="text-align:left;"|1975
|style="text-align:left;"|Buffalo
|7||–||40.9||.476||–||.867||4.3||7.0||2.6||0.1||18.0
|-
|style="text-align:left;"|1976
|style="text-align:left;"|Buffalo
|9||–||42.9||.503||–||.837||5.8||8.6*||1.6||0.0||22.6
|-
|style="text-align:left;"|1983
|style="text-align:left;"|Atlanta
|2||–||7.5||.200||–||1.000||0.5||2.0||0.5||0.0||3.0
|- class="sortbottom"
| style="text-align:center;" colspan="2"| Career
| 24 || – || 38.1 || .465 || – || .816 || 4.5 || 6.5 || 1.8 || 0.1 || 17.5

See also
Iron man
List of National Basketball Association career steals leaders
List of National Basketball Association franchise career scoring leaders

References

External links
Buffalo Sports Hall of Fame
The book "Buffalo, Home of the Braves", complete narrative and photo history of the Buffalo Braves

1948 births
2009 deaths
20th-century African-American sportspeople
21st-century African-American people
African-American basketball players
All-American men's college soccer players
American men's basketball players
Association footballers not categorized by position
Atlanta Hawks players
Basketball players from New York (state)
Buffalo Braves draft picks
Buffalo Braves players
Buffalo State Bengals men's basketball players
Cleveland Cavaliers players
Continental Basketball Association coaches
Detroit Pistons draft picks
National Basketball Association All-Stars
New York Knicks players
People from Bellport, New York
San Diego Clippers players
Shooting guards
Small forwards
Sportspeople from Suffolk County, New York
Association football players not categorized by nationality